Armand Gustav "Mondo" Duplantis (born 10 November 1999) is a Swedish-American pole vaulter, the current world outdoor and indoor record holder ( and ), the current Olympic and World outdoor and indoor champion, the current European champion, and the current Diamond League champion. He won the silver medal at the 2019 World Championships. Duplantis is a two-time European champion from 2018, when he set current world under-20 record, and from 2022. Indoors, he is 2022 World Indoor Championship and 2021 European Indoor Championship gold medallist.

Duplantis won title as a 15-year-old at the 2015 World Youth Championships. A year later, he placed third at the World U20 Championships. In 2017, he took the European U20 title, and the following year, World U20 title. Duplantis is also a two-time Diamond League champion.

Both European and World Athletics Male Rising Star of the Year in 2018, two years later he was voted World Male Athlete of the Year. For his 2022 season, which saw him breaking world records three times, becoming World outdoor and indoor champion, European and Diamond League champion, and clearing six-metre-plus 22 times, Duplantis was crowned both European and World Male Athlete of the Year. As of February 2023, he has cleared six metres or higher 60 times, the most of any athlete in history.

Life and career
Duplantis was born into an athletic family in Lafayette, Louisiana. His two older brothers, Andreas and Antoine, and his younger sister, Johanna, also took up sports; Andreas represented Sweden as a pole vaulter at the 2009 World Youth Championships and 2012 World Junior Championships, while Antoine dropped pole vault for baseball in high school before heading to Louisiana State University where he became the team's career hits leader in 2019.

While growing up in an English-speaking household, Duplantis learned adequate Swedish as his second language. Encouraged by his mother, Duplantis took extensive lessons over Skype in order to improve his fluency and by 2020 he felt that he understood native, and faster, speech much better than he had done in the past. His mother claimed at the same time that while Duplantis felt shy about speaking Swedish in public, he was very happy to do so in private, where there was less pressure. By 2021, after winning the Olympic gold, his knowledge of the language had improved to the point that he felt comfortable doing full Swedish-speaking interviews. In the past, Duplantis has lamented that improving his Swedish has been somewhat hampered by the high level of English skills in Sweden, which has led to native speakers preferring to speak English when talking with him.

After winning the Jerringpriset as the most popular athlete in Sweden in 2020, Duplantis expressed relief that the Swedish public had accepted and embraced him. During said Olympics, Duplantis also stated that his older brother having great experiences representing Sweden at a youth level and his love for Sweden as a child made his choice very easy but that he also feels a strong bond to Lafayette. Duplantis usually divides his year between winters in Louisiana and summers in Uppsala in Sweden, adapted for when the two climates offer the best possibilities for training. With Duplantis' mother Helena being raised in Avesta, the municipality raised a pole vault bar beside the gigantic Dala horse monument to showcase the height of his world record, something that made Duplantis "break down in tears" over the significance of what he had accomplished when he heard about it.

, he holds the world best in all age groups from age seven to age 12; he held the age 13 record until it was broken in May 2015.

2015: U18 world champion
In 2015, his freshman year at Lafayette High School, Duplantis set national freshman records both indoors and outdoors and was named Gatorade Louisiana Boys Track & Field Athlete of the Year. As a citizen of both the United States and Sweden, Duplantis could have chosen to vault for either country internationally; in June 2015 it was announced that he had selected Sweden. Duplantis represented Sweden for the first time at the 2015 World Youth Championships in Cali, Colombia; he won gold on countback with a first-attempt clearance of 5.30 m (17 ft  in), improving his personal best by two centimeters and setting a new championship record.

2016
Duplantis cleared  at a high school meet in Baton Rouge on 6 February 2016, setting a new age-16 world best, world indoor youth best and national high school indoor record; he was the first high school athlete to vault 18 feet indoors. Emmanouil Karalis of Greece, the same age as Duplantis, broke his world marks with a  vault only one week later.

2017: U20 world record and U20 European title
On 11 February 2017, at the Millrose Games, Duplantis jumped  to set the world indoor junior record. That mark was ratified by IAAF. That mark was not ratified due to incorrect peg lengths being used. On 1 April 2017, Duplantis jumped 5.90 m at the Nike Clyde Littlefield Texas Relays, improving his personal record and setting a new World Junior Record. While the IAAF recognized the record with Duplantis representing Sweden, on 2 December 2017, USATF also ratified Duplantis' mark as the American junior record.

2018: U20 World champion, first European title and first jump over 6.00 m 
Duplantis began his 2018 season by improving upon the world indoor junior record by jumping  at the Pole Vault Summit in Reno, Nevada. The 6.05 m vault ranked him tied as the fifth-best pole vaulter in history and tied for the second-best outdoors.

2019: World championship silver medallist

Duplantis placed second at the 2019 IAAF World Championships in Doha, Qatar, clearing  on his third attempt.

2020: First world record
On 4 February, Duplantis cleared  indoors at his first competition of the season. On his second attempt, he cleared the bar but brushed it off with his arm on the way back down.

On 14 July, he received a scholarship from Swedish Crown Princess Victoria.

On 1 December, he was awarded the Svenska Dagbladet Gold Medal for "the most significant Swedish sports achievement of the year".

2021: Olympic title in Tokyo and European indoor title
On 6 March, Duplantis competed at the 2021 European Indoor Championships. He was the overwhelming favourite to win the title after the late withdrawal of Renaud Lavillenie with injury. Duplantis was still tested by Piotr Lisek and Lavillenie's younger brother Valentin, who went on to claim bronze and silver respectively — the latter with a personal best.

Silver medalist Chris Nilsen was full of praise for the winner. He compared the competition against Duplantis that evening as being a regular footballer "trying to emulate Lionel Messi or Cristiano Ronaldo" and that his superiority over the world's best pole vaulters was "impressive and ridiculous".

2022: New world records, first world titles and second European title
On 7 March, he beat his own world record by jumping  at the Belgrade Indoor Meeting. Two weeks later, at the 2022 World Athletics Indoor Championships in Belgrade, he won the gold medal. At the same time, he broke his world record yet again, by jumping .

On 30 June at the BAUHAUS-galan, Duplantis broke his own outdoor world best of  set in 2020, by jumping .

Duplantis capped his season in September by clearing  at the Zürich Diamond League final to retain the Diamond Trophy.

2023: Sixth world record
Duplantis got his 2023 campaign off to strong start at the Mondo Classic in Uppsala, the meet named after him. His winning height of  represented not only his best ever season opener but also the highest season-opening performance of any pole vaulter in history. He also broke Bubka's record of 11 vaults of 6.10 m or higher (including indoors and outdoors).

Achievements

Information from World Athletics profile.

International competitions

Source:

Circuit wins and titles
 Diamond League pole vault champion:  2021,  2022 
 2018 (1): Stockholm
 2019 (1): Stanford
 2020 (7): Oslo, Monaco, Stockholm, Lausanne (WL ), Brussels (MR), Rome (WL DLR ), Doha (=MR)
 2021 (5): Oslo (MR), Stockholm (MR), Paris (MR), Brussels (MR), Zürich (MR)
 2022 (7): Doha, Eugene, Oslo (WL MR), Stockholm (DLR), Chorzów (MR), Lausanne (MR), Zürich (MR)

Progression and records
Key: 

Source:

References

External links

1999 births
Living people
Swedish male pole vaulters
Swedish people of American descent
American people of Swedish descent
American people of Creole descent
Swedish people of French descent
American people of French descent
People with acquired Swedish citizenship
Cajun sportspeople
European Athletics Rising Star of the Year winners
European Athletics Championships winners
World Athletics Championships athletes for Sweden
World Athletics Championships winners
Sportspeople from Lafayette, Louisiana
Track and field athletes from Louisiana
World Athletics record holders
World Athletics indoor record holders
World Athletics U20 Championships winners
LSU Tigers track and field athletes
European Athletics Indoor Championships winners
Athletes (track and field) at the 2020 Summer Olympics
World record holders in athletics (track and field)
Medalists at the 2020 Summer Olympics
Olympic gold medalists in athletics (track and field)
Olympic gold medalists for Sweden
Olympic athletes of Sweden
Diamond League winners
Swedish people of Canadian descent
World Athletics Indoor Championships winners